Harmony Lane is a 1935 low-budget American film directed by Joseph Santley, based upon the life of Stephen Foster, released by Mascot Pictures.

This was the first sound film based on the life of the famous composer. Two others would follow, both in color: Swanee River (1939) (the most elaborate and largest budgeted of the three), and I Dream of Jeannie (1952).

Plot summary
The life and loves of composer Stephen Foster, from his early success through his decline, degradation, and death from (assumed) alcoholism.

Cast
Douglass Montgomery as Stephen Foster
Evelyn Venable as Susan Pentland
Adrienne Ames as Jane McDowell
Joseph Cawthorn as Professor Henry Kleber
William Frawley as Edwin P. 'Ed' Christy
David Torrence as Mr. Pentland
Gilbert Emery as Mr. Foster
Lloyd Hughes as Andrew Robinson
Al Herman as Tambo
Cora Sue Collins as Marian Foster
James Bush as Morrison Foster
Edith Craig as Henrietta Foster
Florence Roberts as Mrs. Foster
Ferdinand Munier as Mr. Pond
Clarence Muse as Old Joe

Soundtrack
Oh! Susanna,

Lou'siana Belle,

The Old Folks at Home,

My Old Kentucky Home,

Old Black Joe,

Why No One to Love,

Beautiful Dreamer.

All written by Stephen Foster

External links

1935 films
1930s romantic musical films
American biographical films
American black-and-white films
American romantic musical films
Films about composers
Mascot Pictures films
Cultural depictions of Stephen Foster
War romance films
Films produced by Nat Levine
Films set in the 19th century
1930s historical films
American historical films
1930s English-language films
1930s American films